Chandlers Valley is an unincorporated community in Warren County, Pennsylvania, United States. Chandlers Valley has a post office with ZIP code 16312.

Climate

Notable person
Lafayette M. Sturdevant (1856-1923), Wisconsin Attorney General, was born in Chandlers Valley.

Notes

Unincorporated communities in Warren County, Pennsylvania
Unincorporated communities in Pennsylvania